The 2004 Utah Utes football team represented the University of Utah in the 2004 NCAA Division I-A football season. This team was the original 'BCS Buster', meaning, this was the first time that a team from a BCS non-AQ conference was invited to play in one of the BCS bowl games. The team, coached by second-year head football coach Urban Meyer, played its home games in Rice-Eccles Stadium.

Utah finished the season 12–0, the fourth undefeated and untied season in school history. The Utes were one of three teams in the top-level Division I FBS to finish the season undefeated (the others being the USC Trojans and the Auburn Tigers.)

Utah was the highest-ranked BCS non-AQ team in each poll every week of the season.

Schedule

Rankings

Game summaries

Texas A&M

Arizona

Utah State

Air Force

New Mexico

North Carolina

UNLV

San Diego State

Colorado State

Wyoming

BYU

Source:

Fiesta Bowl: Utah vs. Pittsburgh

Depth chart

Season Statistics
2004 Official Stats

Team

Individual Leaders

After the season

NFL Draft
Utah had five players taken in the 2005 NFL Draft:

Awards

National
Urban Meyer: The Home Depot Coach of the Year Award, Eddie Robinson Coach of the Year, Woody Hayes' National Coach of the Year, Maxwell George Munger Award
Alex Smith: Heisman finalist (fourth place), The Sporting News National Player of the Year, Sports Illustrated National Player of the Year, Cingular Sports/ABC Sports All-American, SI.com All-American (first team), CoSIDA Football Academic All-American of the Year, Davey O'Brien Award finalist, Walter Camp Award finalist
Chris Kemoeatu: Cingular Sports/ABC Sports All-American, SI.com All-American (first team)
Morgan Scalley: SI.com All-American (second team), CoSIDA Academic All-American (first team), Anson Mount Scholar-Athlete of the Year, Bronko Nagurski National Player of the Week, Pat Tillman Award (East–West Shrine Game honor)
Steve Savoy: SI.com All-American (second team), The Sporting News All-American (honorable mention)
Ryan Smith: The Sporting News Freshman All-American (second team)
Spencer Toone: CoSIDA Academic All-District VIII first team

Conference
Coach of the Year: Urban Meyer
Offensive Player of the Year: Alex Smith
Co-defensive Player of the Year: Morgan Scalley
All-MWC First team: Alex Smith, Steve Savoy, Chris Kemoeatu, Steve Fifita, Sione Pouha, Morgan Scalley
All-MWC Second team: Paris Warren, Marty Johnson, Jesse Boone, Eric Weddle
All-MWC Honorable mention: Makai Aalona, Quinton Ganther, Tommy Hackenbruck, Matt Kovacevich, Spencer Toone

See also
 List of undefeated Division I football teams

References

Utah
Utah Utes football seasons
Mountain West Conference football champion seasons
Fiesta Bowl champion seasons
College football undefeated seasons
Utah Utes football